Ester Partegàs (born 1972) is a Spanish contemporary artist and educator. She lives and works in Brooklyn, New York.

Biography 
Ester Partegàs was born in 1972 in La Garriga, Barcelona, Spain. She has an B.F.A. degree (in sculpture) from the Universitat de Barcelona and has completed postgraduate studies at Hochschule der Künste in Berlin. She participated in the International Studio and Curatorial Program, New York, in 1999.

Her work has been exhibited internationally, including the Aldrich Contemporary Art Museum (Connecticut), Museo Nacional Centro de Arte Reina Sofía (Madrid), 2nd Moscow Bienniale, Weatherspoon Art Museum (Greensboro, North Carolina), Walker's Point Center for the Arts (Milwaukee, Wisconsin), Virginia Commonwealth University (Richmond, Virginia), Cercle Cultural Caja Madrid (Barcelona), SculptureCenter (New York), Rice University Art Gallery (Houston, Texas), Queens Museum of Art (New York) and Whitney Museum of American Art (Altria, New York).

Collections 
 Museum of Modern Art (MoMA), New York City, New York
 The Dikeou Collection, Denver, Colorado
 Coca-Cola Espana Foundation, Madrid
Instituto de la Juventud, Madrid
 CajaMadrid, Madrid

References

Further reading 

 Alvarez-Reyes, José Antonio. "Ester Partegàs", Flash Art International, No. 234, January–February 2004: 105.
 Ammarati, Domenick. "Make It Now", Artforum International, October 2005: 278.
 Baird, Daniel. "Make It Now", Brooklyn Rail, July-August 2005: 12. 
 Momin, Shamim M. "Moving About Matters", Calories, Slave Magazine, 2006. 
 Navarro, Mariano. "Ester Partegas, a través de la grieta", El Mundo, January 2008. 
 Peran, Marti and Ester Partegàs. "Sky-Lines", Calories, Slave Magazine, October-November 2005. 
 Rodriguez, Marta. "Cart(ajena)", ArtNexus, No. 65, Vol. 6: 155-158. 
 Smith, Roberta. "The Many Shades of Now, Explored in 3 Dimensions", The New York Times, 27 May 2005: E37. 
 Stolz, George. "Ester Partegas", ARTnews, June 2007: 148. 
 Volk, Gregory. "Fixed and Hazardous Objects", Virginia Commonwealth University, 2006.

External links
Official website

1972 births
Living people
20th-century Spanish women artists
21st-century Spanish women artists
Women artists from Catalonia
Spanish contemporary artists